Giovanni Battista Galliadi (Sant'Arcangelo di Romagna, 1751–1811) was an Italian painter, mainly of portraits and genre subjects. He studied under Guido Reni.

References

1751 births
1811 deaths
18th-century Italian painters
Italian male painters
19th-century Italian painters
19th-century Italian male artists
Painters from Bologna
18th-century Italian male artists